Ballydoyle (23 March 1980 – 2000) was a Thoroughbred racehorse who sold for a record-setting $3.5 million ($ million inflation adjusted) as a Yearling in 1981. He showed average ability on the racecourse, winning one race in Ireland as a two-year-old.

Background
Ballydoyle was a bay horse bred in Ontario by E P Taylor the owner of Windfields Farm. He was one of many important winners sired by Northern Dancer, that won the Kentucky Derby in 1964 before becoming one of the most successful breeding stallions in Thoroughbred history. His dam, South Ocean, had previously produced Northernette (also sired by Northern Dancer), the champion filly of her generation in Canada at two and three years of age. Four years later she produced Storm Bird, the top-rated European two-year-old of 1980.

The yearling was sent to the Keeneland Sales in July 1981 where he was sold for a then world-record price of $3.5 million by the bloodstock agency BBA (Ireland) on behalf of the British businessman Robert Sangster. The colt was sent to Europe where he was trained by Vincent O'Brien: he was named after O'Brien's training base at Ballydoyle, County Tipperary.

Racing career
After finishing unplaced on his racecourse debut he contested a one-mile maiden race at Leopardstown Racecourse in October. He went clear of his rivals a furlong from the finish but was caught in the final strides and beaten a neck by the Edward O'Grady-trained Putney Bridge. In November he started at odds of 2/5 for a six-furlong maiden at Naas Racecourse. He led from the start and won by three lengths from Glenhurst and eleven others.

Stud record
Ballydoyle was retired from racing and became a breeding stallion in California. He sired several minor winners but none of any importance. He died in 2000.

Pedigree

References

1980 racehorse births
2000 racehorse deaths
Thoroughbred family 4-j
Racehorses bred in Canada
Racehorses trained in Ireland